Leonard Linsky (November 13, 1922 – August 27, 2012) was an American philosopher of language. He was an Emeritus Professor of the University of Chicago.

Philosophical work

Linsky was best known for work on the theory of reference, and also as an historian of early analytical philosophy.  He is often cited as an example of the "orthodox view" in the theory of reference. He questioned the "intensional isomorphism" concept of Rudolf Carnap.

Books

Authored
Referring, London: Routledge & Keagan Paul, 1967.
Names and Descriptions, Chicago: University of Chicago Press, 1977.
Oblique Contexts, Chicago: University of Chicago Press, 1983.

Edited

Semantics and the Philosophy of Language: A Collection of Readings, Urbana, Ill.: University of Illinois Press, 1952.
Reference and Modality (Oxford Readings in Philosophy), Oxford: Oxford University Press, 1971.

See also
American philosophy
List of American philosophers

Notes

Further reading
William Tait (ed.), Early Analytic Philosophy: Frege, Russell, Wittgenstein; Essays in Honor of Leonard Linsky, Chicago, Ill.: Open Court, 1997.
"Leonard Linsky”, article in Dictionary of Contemporary American Philosophers, Bristol: Thoemmes Press, 2005.

1922 births
American historians of philosophy
Analytic philosophers
21st-century American philosophers
20th-century American philosophers
Philosophers of language
2012 deaths
University of Chicago faculty